The 1946 SFR Yugoslavia Chess Championship was the 2nd edition of SFR Yugoslav Chess Championship. Held between 15 September and 11 October  1946 in Zagreb, SFR Yugoslavia, SR Croatia. The tournament was won by Petar Trifunović.

Table and results

References 

Yugoslav Chess Championships
1946 in chess
Chess